Villa Dolores Airport  is an airport serving Villa Dolores, a city in the Córdoba Province of Argentina. The airport is on the eastern end of the city.

There is distant rising terrain to the east. Runway 35 length includes a  displaced threshold. The Villa Dolores non-directional beacon (Ident: LDR) is located on the field.

See also

Transport in Argentina
List of airports in Argentina

References

External links
OpenStreetMap - Villa Dolores Airport

Airports in Argentina